Pediobius is a genus of hymenopteran insects of the chalcid wasp family Eulophidae. Like their relatives, the larvae of these diminutive wasps are parasitoids of various arthropods (mainly insects). Some Pediobius are used in biological pest control.

There are over 200 species in the genus Pedobius and these include:

Pediobius foveolatus Crawford, 1912
 Pediobius imbreus (Walker, 1846)
 Pediobius lysis (Walker, 1839)
 Pediobius metallicus (Nees, 1834)
 Pediobius parvulus (Ferrière, 1933)

References
Key to Nearctic eulophid genera
Universal Chalcidoidea Database

Eulophidae